is the first mini-album to be released by the J-pop idol group Morning Musume.

Overview
It was released on December 13, 2006. The album was released in two versions– a standard edition, containing only the CD (with a photocard included with the first press editions), and a limited edition containing a bonus DVD.

This mini-album is considered to be their "7.5th album", as it was released between their seventh and eighth albums. All of the tracks were written and composed by Tsunku. The songs were composed to have a "wintry" feel, and the single "Aruiteru", their last single of 2006, was added to the track list. Since eighth-generation member Aika Mitsui did not officially join the group until December 10, three days before the EP was released, she did not participate in the recording.

The EP features five tracks by solo and or smaller combinations of band members, the second Morning Musume non-single release since Rainbow 7 to do so.

Track listing

CD 
 
 
 Performed by Reina Tanaka
 
 Performed by Ai Takahashi, with spoken-word intro and outro by MC Gaki (Risa Niigaki)
 
 Performed by Miki Fujimoto with Chisato Okai and Mai Hagiwara of Cute
 
 Performed by Hitomi Yoshizawa, Eri Kamei and Risa Niigaki
 
 Performed by Sayumi Michishige and Koharu Kusumi

Limited Edition DVD 
Performances from Morning Musume Concert Tour 2006 Aki ~Odore! Morning Curry~

External links 
 7.5 Fuyu Fuyu Morning Musume Mini! entry at the official Up-Front Works discography 

Morning Musume albums
2006 debut EPs
Zetima compilation albums
Zetima EPs
Japanese-language EPs